Manyoni District is one of the six districts in the Singida Region of Tanzania.  The district capital is the town of Manyoni.  The district is bordered to the north by the Ikungi District, to the east by the Dodoma Region, to the south by the Iringa Region, to the southwest by the Mbeya Region and to the west by the Tabora Region. In 2015 the Itigi District was created from the Manyoni District, separating the Itigi Division that was the large portion of the south western of the district.

According to the 2002 Tanzania National Census, the population of the Manyoni District was 205,423.

According to the 2012 Tanzania National Census, the population of Manyoni District was 296,763.

The District Commissioner of the Manyoni District is Rahabu Mwagisa Solomon.

Transport
Paved trunk road T3 from Morogoro to the Rwanda border passes through the district.

The town of Manyoni has a station on the Central Railway of the Tanzanian Railways.

Administrative subdivisions
As of 2012, Manyoni District was administratively divided into 30 wards.

Wards

 Aghondi
 Chikola
 Chikuyu
 Heka
 Idodyandole
 Ipande
 Isseke
 Itigi Majengo
 Itigi Mjini
 Kintinku
 Kitaraka
 Majiri
 Makanda
 Makuru
 Makutopora
 Manyoni
 Mgandu
 Mitundu
 Mkwese
 Muhalala
 Mvumi
 Mwamagembe
 Nkonko
 Rungwa
 Sanjaranda
 Sanza
 Saranda
 Sasajila
 Sasilo
 Solya

See also 
 Railway stations in Tanzania

Sources
Manyoni District Homepage for the 2002 Tanzania National Census
Tanzanian Government Directory Database

References